Murezzan Andreossi (30 June 1897 – 28 September 1958) was a Swiss ice hockey player who competed in the 1928 Winter Olympics in St. Moritz, Switzerland. He was a member of the Switzerland national men's ice hockey team that won the bronze medal.

External links
Mezzi Andreossi's profile at databaseOlympics
Mezzi Andreossi's profile at Sports Reference.com

1897 births
1958 deaths
Ice hockey players at the 1928 Winter Olympics
Medalists at the 1928 Winter Olympics
Olympic bronze medalists for Switzerland
Olympic ice hockey players of Switzerland
Olympic medalists in ice hockey